AMAS  (an acronym for Anuario de la Musica de Asturias) Awards is the official music award in Asturias, held every year since 2005. The name translates in English as "Yearbook of the Music of Asturias". Some important Spanish bands, like Avalanch (also Alberto Rionda as singer and composer), WarCry (also Víctor García as singer, Pablo García as guitarist, Rafael Yugueros as drummer), El Sueño de Morfeo have received awards as musical ensemble and in the sub-categories. Some other influential artists, such as Melendi, Feedbacks, among others

Categories 
These are the different categories of AMAS awards: 
 Revelation Band 
 Best Singer
 Best Guitarist
 Best Bassist
 Best Keyboardist
 Best Drummer
Best Folk Song
Best Song (other scenes)
Best Rock Song
Best Rock-Pop Song
Best Composer
Best Producer
Best Folk Album
Best Hip-Hop Album
Best Album (other scenes)
Best Rock Album
Best Rock-Pop Album
Best Piper (new values)
Best Performer (other instruments)
Best Lyricist 
Best Soundtrack of Asturian Short Film. 
Best Concert
Best Album Cover
Best Music Video
Award of Honor

External links 
  Premios AMAS  — official website

Spanish music awards
Asturian music